Ana María Cetto Kramis (born 1946, in Mexico City) is a Mexican physicist and professor. She is known for her contributions to quantum mechanics, stochastic, electrodynamics, and biophysics of light, and for her work as a pacifist. From 2003 to 2010 she was Deputy Director General of the International Atomic Energy Agency (IAEA). She is also professor at the Faculty of Sciences at the National Autonomous University of Mexico (UNAM), of which she was also director. Cetto is responsible for several scientific literature programs in Latin America and for several international programs on the promotion and participation of women in science.

Early life and education
She has a bachelor's degree in physics from the National Autonomous University of Mexico (UNAM) and graduate degrees from both, Harvard University and the National Autonomous University of Mexico. At Harvard University, she did a master's degree in biophysics, then returning to Mexico, where she obtained her master's degree and PhD in physics at UNAM. Becoming the first woman doctorate in Mexico. She is a researcher at the Physics Institute of the UNAM, and professor at the Faculty of Sciences of the same university. She is also the daughter of the renowned Mexican architect Max Cetto.

National and international work
Ana María Cetto is an expert in theoretical physics, her specialty is Quantum Mechanics, Stochastic Electrodynamics and Biological Physics. She has been director of the Faculty of Sciences at UNAM (1978-1982), as well as a professor, and researcher at the same institution. She was elected president of the executive committee 2021-2022 of the Mexican Physical Society.

Ana María Cetto has been involved in the management of several international organizations. In 1995, she was council member of the Pugwash Conferences, and in 2002 she was appointed as general secretary of the International Council for Science (ICSU), becoming the first Latin American appointed to the position. Cetto has also been a founding vice president of the Third World Organization for Women in Science (TWOWS). From 2003 to 2010 she was Deputy Technical Director of the International Atomic Energy Agency (IAEA). She has also been a member of the Governing Board of the United Nations University (UNU) and President of the Council of the International Foundation for Science (IFS).

Cetto's trajectory has been recognized in different occasions: she was awarded as "Woman of the Year" in Mexico in 2003, and she has also received several other distinctions as a member of the Third World Academy of Science, the Mexican Academy of Science, the Mexican Physics Academy and the American Physical Society. She is also a member of the World Future Council.

In 2015, the University of Guadalajara created the "Ana María Cetto Chair for the Diffusion of Scientific Culture" in recognition of her scientific work. Ana María Cetto has also participated in several international programs aimed at promoting women's participation in science. Because of her advocacy activities, she received the "Sor Juana Inés de la Cruz" distinction awarded by the UNAM. She is also responsible for scientific information programs in Latin America, and programs for the promotion and participation of women in science as well.

Throughout her trajectory, she has been committed to promoting women's participation in science. Among various initiatives, she is part of the jury of the Ada Byron Award, Mexico Chapter, an award created by the University of Deusto to recognize women who work in the labor fields of science, technology, engineering, and mathematics.

Museum of Light 
Ana María Cetto participated in the project focused on the creation of the Museum of Light in Mexico City. The Museum of Light is a thematic museum of the General Directorate for the Dissemination of Science of UNAM, and was inaugurated in 1996. Cetto was in charge of its renovation in 2016. She was also a promoter of the International Year of Light 2015 and belongs to the International Steering Committee of the International Day of Light.

Scientific dissemination 
Another of her lines of work has been the dissemination of scientific content. She has directed the Mexican Journal of Physics and is the founding president of Latindex, the Regional Online Information System for Ibero-American Scientific Journals created in 1997.

Advocacy 
Ana María Cetto's work has been related to the Nobel Peace Prize on two different occasions. She was Council member of the Pugwash Conferences when the international organization received the Nobel Peace Prize in 1995. The prize was granted for "their efforts to diminish the part played by nuclear arms in international politics and, in the longer run, to eliminate such arms." From 2003 to 2010 she was Deputy Director General and Head of Technical Cooperation Department of the International Atomic Energy Agency (IAEA) dedicated to the control of the proliferation of nuclear weapons. The IAEA was awarded the Nobel Peace Prize in 2005 for "their effort to prevent nuclear energy from being used for military purposes and to ensure that nuclear energy for peaceful purposes is used in the safest possible way."

Awards and honors 
Apart from the awards and honors already mentioned, Ana María Cetto's work has been recognized with several other distinctions, including the following:

 Gold Medal of the International League of Humanists (1998)
 Prize for the Development of Physics of the Mexican Society of Physics (2000)
 Honorary doctorate from the National University of Tajikistan (2007)
 Second place in the Award for Mexican Women Inventors and Innovators for the Latindex Project (2008) 
 Juchimán Silver Prize in Science and Technology 2010, Mexico, (2011) 
 Physics Research Prize (2012) 
 Selected as one of the thirteen women for the "Woman and Science: 13 Names to Change the World" Exhibition (2013) 
 In 2015 she was included among the 50 most outstanding women in Mexico by Forbes Mexico magazine 
 International Festival of Mayan Culture (FICMAYA) 2017 Gold Medal

Selected work

Selected articles

 Ceccon E, Cetto AM. Capacity building for sustainable development: some Mexican perspectives. INTERNATIONAL JOURNAL OF SUSTAINABLE DEVELOPMENT AND WORLD ECOLOGY 10 (4): 345-352 DEC 2003 
 de la Pena L, Cetto AM.  Planck's law as a consequence of the zeropoint radiation field REVISTA MEXICANA DE FÍSICA 48: 1-8 Suppl. 1 SEP 2002 
 de la Pena L, Cetto AM. Quantum theory and linear stochastic electrodynamics. FOUNDATIONS OF PHYSICS 31 (12): 1703-1731 DEC 2001 
 Vessuri H, Cetto AM. "Pertinence" and "impact". INTERCIENCIA 24 (3): 146-150 MAY-JUN 1999 
 Cetto AM, Alonso-Gamboa O. Scientific periodicals in Latin America and the Caribbean: A global perspective. INTERCIENCIA 23 (2): 84-+ MAR-APR 1998 
 de la Pena L, Cetto AM. Estimate of Planck's constant from an electromagnetic Mach principle. FOUNDATIONS OF PHYSICS LETTERS 10 (6): 591-598 DEC 1997

Books

 Cetto, Ana María. La luz en la naturaleza y en el laboratorio. México, D.F.: Sep-Fondo de Cultura Económica : Conacyt, 1987. Serie  La ciencia desde México; 32.

References

Notes

Bibliography

External links 
 Ana María Cetto's IAEA page Spanish
 Physics Institute UNAM Spanish

1946 births
20th-century Mexican physicists
National Autonomous University of Mexico alumni
Harvard University alumni
Academic staff of the National Autonomous University of Mexico
Living people
Scientists from Mexico City
International Atomic Energy Agency officials
Mexican people of Italian descent
21st-century Mexican physicists
Mexican women physicists
Mexican physicists